The Association Nationale des Guides de Guinée is the national Guiding organization of Guinea. In 2018, there were 4,889 members. The girls-only organization became a full member of the World Association of Girl Guides and Girl Scouts in 2014.

See also
Association Nationale des Scouts de Guinée

References

World Association of Girl Guides and Girl Scouts member organizations
Scouting and Guiding in Guinea